Death in Summer is a novel written by William Trevor, first published in 1998 by Viking Press.

Plot summary
Death in Summer revolves around Thaddeus Davenant, whose young wife, Letitia Iveson, was killed in a freak accident on a bicycle. Letitia leaves behind their six-month-old baby girl Georgina; her mother, Mrs Iveson, advises Thaddeus to employ a child minder. One of those interviewed is Pettie, a girl who was brought up in a foster home abused by a sinister "Sunday uncle". She grows increasingly obsessed with Thaddeus and his baby after seeing them just once.

1998 Irish novels
Viking Press books
Works by William Trevor